The 2009 Turkish Cup Final was played between Beşiktaş, and Fenerbahçe on 13 May 2009 in Izmir. Beşiktaş won 4–2.

Beşiktaş J.K.
Beşiktaş was put in group A, along with Antalyaspor, Gaziantepspor, Trabzonspor and Gaziantep BB. Beşiktaş won all 4 group matches and preceded to the quarter-finals against Antalyaspor. Beşiktaş won at away 2–0 and at home 3–1. In the semi-finals, Beşiktaş beat Ankaraspor 3–1 away and lost 2–1 at home, putting Beşiktaş in their 13th Turkish Cup final.

Fenerbahçe S.K.
Fenerbahçe was put in Group C with Bursaspor, Eskişehirspor, Ankaragücü and Tokatspor. Fenerbahçe won all 4 group matches to put them in the quarter-finals. Fenerbahçe beat Bursaspor 1–0 away and 3–1 at home. In the semi-finals, Fenerbahçe beat Sivasspor 3–1 at home and a 0–0 tie away.

Final

Yusuf Şimşek put Beşiktaş in the lead with an early goal against Fenerbahçe (1–0). Both teams missed scoring chances until the 26th minute, when Daniel Güiza scored the equalizer (1–1). Bobô scored Beşiktaş' second goal in the 56th minute  (2–1), then scored another in the 73rd minute (3–1). Filip Hološko delivered the final blow with a goal in the 80th minute (4–1). A goal scored by Alex on a penalty kick made the score 4–2 in the 90th minute. Beşiktaş won their eighth Turkish Cup, their third in four years.

Match details

See also
Turkish Super Cup 2009
Turkish Cup

External links
http://www.tff.org/default.aspx?pageID=267&ftxtID=7047

Turkish Cup finals
Cup
Turkish Cup Final 2009
Turkish Cup Final 2009